Railways in Jiangsu, China have existed in the province since the early 20th century. More than 40 large and medium-sized cities in Jiangsu are connected by rail; Nanjing and Xuzhou are transportation centers. Two national rail lines—Longhai Railway (with service from Lianyungang to Ürümqi) and Jinghu Railway (with service from Beijing to Shanghai)—cross the province. A rail link among eight cities in the province (Nanjing, Zhenjiang, Changzhou, Wuxi, Suzhou, Yangzhou, Taizhou and Nantong) is planned. Train travel is popular in China; it is fast, more widely available than automobile travel and more economical than travel by air.

History 
The first railway in Jiangsu Province was the South Yangtze River section of the Jinghu Railway. A line from Shanghai to Xiaguan and Nanjing, known as the Huning Railway (and during the Republic of China era as the Kingwu Railway), was completed between April 1905 and July 1908 following an investment of British capital. In 1933, a train ferry service was opened on the Yangtze between Xiaguan and Pukou (both in Nanjing), and a direct express was initiated from Shanghai to Peiping.

Further track upgrades were completed over the following 50 years.

Operational lines 
Jinghu Railway (Jiangsu section)
Longhai Railway (east section)
Ningxi Railway
Ningtong Railway
Ningqi Railway
Xinchang Railway
Hening Railway
Huning Intercity Railway
Jinghu High Speed Railway (Jiangsu section)
Ninghang Intercity Railway
Ningan Intercity Railway

Under construction 

Shanghai–Nantong Railway
Huaiyangzhen Railway
Lianyan Railway

Planning 

Suhuai Railway (Suzhou to Huaian)
Zhennan Railway
Changsujia Intercity Railway
Xuding Railway(Xuzhou to Dingtao)
Haiyang Railway (Haian to Yangkou)
Fengpei Railway (Feng to Pei)

See also 
Rail transport in the People's Republic of China
List of railways in China

References 

Railway lines in China